Assaf Tzur (or Asaf, ; born 28 August 1998) is an Israeli footballer who plays as a goalkeeper for Ironi Kiryat Shmona.

Early life
Tzur was born in Petah Tikva, Israel, to a family of Jewish background.

Career
Tzur is a product of Hapoel Petah Tikva academy and in 2015 he became a permanent player in the senior team.

Hapoel Petah Tikva

He made his debut for Hapoel Petah Tikva senior team on 13 May 2016 in a match against Maccabi Herzliya.

Hapoel Ra'anana
On 2016, he moved to Hapoel Ra'anana academy and he promote to senior team on 01 June 2017.

Tzur made his debut for Hapoel Ra'anana senior team on 06 June 2017 in a match against F.C. Ashdod.

He have 76 appearances with Hapoel Ra'anana until 14 September 2020 when he moved to Cypriot First Division club, Anorthosis on loan.

Anorthosis Famagusta

On 14 September 2020, Tzur joined Anorthosis Famagusta on loan until the end of the season.

On 13 July 2021, Anorthosis Famagusta announced the renewal of the loan for another year.

Career statistics

Honours
Anorthosis
Cypriot Cup: 2020–21

References

External links
 

1998 births
Living people
Israeli footballers
Israeli Jews
Hapoel Petah Tikva F.C. players
Hapoel Ra'anana A.F.C. players
Anorthosis Famagusta F.C. players
Hapoel Ironi Kiryat Shmona F.C. players
Liga Leumit players
Israeli Premier League players
Footballers from Petah Tikva
Israeli expatriate footballers
Expatriate footballers in Cyprus
Israeli expatriate sportspeople in Cyprus
Association football goalkeepers
Israel under-21 international footballers